Leavesden may mean:
Leavesden, Hertfordshire, an area of Watford, Hertfordshire, England
Leavesden Aerodrome, a former airfield in Leavesden, Herts.
Warner Bros. Studios, Leavesden, a film and media complex owned by Warner Bros. on the site of the former Rolls-Royce factory at Leavesden Aerodrome
Leavesden Hospital, on the outskirts of Abbots Langley, England